OMX Helsinki 25 (formerly HEX25) is a stock market index for the Helsinki Stock Exchange. It is a market value weighted index that consists of the 25 most-traded stock classes. The maximum weight for a single stock is limited to 10%. This is mainly to limit Nokia's weight in the index, although Fortum and Sampo Group were also capped in a February 2009 reshuffle.

Components

As of August 2020, the following 25 companies make up the index:

See also
Helsinki Stock Exchange

References

External links
Bloomberg page for HEX25:IND
 OMX Helsinki 25 composition

European stock market indices
Nasdaq Nordic
Economy of Helsinki